Stepan Matviyiv (10 March 1968) is a retired Ukrainian professional footballer and manager.

Matviyiv was born in Stryi Raion, Lviv Oblast.  He made his professional debut in the Soviet Second League in 1990 for FC Dnipro Cherkasy.

Honours
 Ukrainian Second League champion: 1992–93, 1993–94

References

External links
 

1968 births
Living people
Soviet footballers
Ukrainian footballers
Ukrainian Premier League players
Ukrainian First League players
Ukrainian Second League players
FC Systema-Boreks Borodianka players
FC Dnipro Cherkasy players
FC Arsenal Kyiv players
FC Volyn Lutsk players
FC Spartak Ivano-Frankivsk players
FC CSKA Kyiv players
FC Borysfen Boryspil players
FC Khutrovyk Tysmenytsia players
FC Torpedo Zaporizhzhia players
FC HU ZIDMU-Spartak Zaporizhia players
FC Prykarpattia-2 Ivano-Frankivsk players
FC Yevropa Pryluky players
FC Borysfen-2 Boryspil players
FC Borysfen-2 Boryspil managers
FC Systema-Boreks Borodianka managers
FC Borysfen Boryspil managers
FC Metalurh Donetsk managers
FC Knyazha Shchaslyve managers
FC Prykarpattia Ivano-Frankivsk (2004) managers
FC Kalush managers
Association football midfielders
Ukrainian football managers
Sportspeople from Lviv Oblast